Binny Bansal (born 1982/1983) is an Indian billionaire Internet entrepreneur. In 2007 he co-founded the e-commerce platform Flipkart with Sachin Bansal (no relation) and served as the chief operating officer until 11 January 2016 and was then promoted to chief executive officer (CEO). In January 2017 he was promoted to Group CEO and resigned in November 2018 due to personal misconduct allegations of Flipkart. Binny is from Chandigarh and graduated from the Indian Institute of Technology Delhi with a degree in computer science and engineering. He is currently an anchor investor in the venture firm 021 Capital which focuses on investing in the fields of biotechnology, agritech, and the internet.

Early life
Binny Bansal is originally from Chandigarh, the capital city of Punjab and Haryana. His business partner, Sachin Bansal, is also from Chandigarh. Although they share the same last name, they are not related. They both coincidentally, were students of computer science engineering at Indian Institute of Technology, Delhi. Bansal currently resides in Bangalore. His father is a retired chief manager at a bank and his mother is in the government sector. He has no siblings and is married to a homemaker.

He has twin sons with his wife Trisha Bansal.

Career
Before co-founding Flipkart, Binny was employed by Amazon for nine months, and before that he had been rejected by Google twice. Binny Bansal and his business partner Sachin Bansal initially thought of starting a comparison search engine, but realized that the market for E-commerce in India was very small. Hence, after leaving Amazon in 2007, they founded Flipkart as an e-commerce company. Before joining Amazon, Binny had worked with Sarnoff Corporation for a year and a half, where he developed a lane sensor device for cars which would warn you and beep automatically if you changed lanes without giving a signal.

In 2016, Binny Bansal became the CEO of Flipkart, where he worked on strategic development, direction and business management. In 2017, he assumed the role of CEO of Flipkart Group and his previous position was handed to Kalyan Krishnamurthy.

In 2018, Walmart acquired a 77% stake in Flipkart group. After the acquisition, Binny Bansal assumed the role of chairman and continued as Group CEO. His 5.5% stake in Flipkart was valued at $1 billion after the acquisition. He resigned from Flipkart in November 2018 on allegations of personal misconduct.

He is also an angel investor in multiple startups, including BrightCHAMPS, Virgio, Flash, Hire Quotient and Glints.He also helped back about 47 companies so far spread across 64 funding rounds which includes 28 deals in the seed stage, 14 in early and 4 in late-stage.

Awards and recognition
 In September 2015, Binny Bansal along with Sachin Bansal, was named the 86th richest person in India with a net worth of $1.3 billion by Forbes India Rich List.
 India Today ranked him #26th along with Sachin Bansal in India's 50 Most powerful people of 2017 list.

References

External links
 

Living people
Businesspeople from Chandigarh
Indian software engineers
20th-century Indian businesspeople
Year of birth missing (living people)
Place of birth missing (living people)
IIT Delhi alumni
Indian chief operating officers
Amazon (company) people
Indian billionaires
Flipkart people
Indian Internet company founders
Indian technology chief executives
Indian technology company founders
Indian online retailer founders
St. Anne's Convent School, Chandigarh alumni
1980s births